Liu Weidong (born 29 January 1987) is a Chinese association football player.

Club career
Liu started his career playing for Changchun Yatai and would make his league debut for the club on 31 March 2007 against Liaoning F.C. in a 3–2 home victory home. Throughout the season he would often be used as a late substitute, however would earn eight caps in 2007 Chinese Super League season as Changchun would win the league title. The following season would see Liu start more games and his added playing time would see him score his first CSL goal on 11 October 2008, in a 6–0 victory to Guangzhou Pharmaceutical.

On 5 February 2015, Liu was loaned to Chinese Super League side Chongqing Lifan until 31 December 2015.
On 19 February 2016, Liu joined Chongqing Lifan on a four-year contract.

Career statistics
.

Honours
Changchun Yatai
Chinese Super League: 2007

References

External links
 
Player stats at Sohu.com

1987 births
Living people
Footballers from Changchun
Chinese footballers
Changchun Yatai F.C. players
Chongqing Liangjiang Athletic F.C. players
Chinese Super League players
Association football forwards